N-space may refer to:
 n-Space, video game development company
 -dimensional space, in physics and mathematics, a space of dimension .
 En space, in typography, a space that is one en wide ( )
 N-Space (short story collection), a book from 1990
 N-Space, the in-universe term for the Doctor Who universe